Almyra Municipal Airport  is a city-owned, public-use airport located three nautical miles (6 km) west of the central business district of Almyra, a city in Arkansas County, Arkansas, United States. This airport is included in the FAA's National Plan of Integrated Airport Systems for 2009–2013, which categorizes it as a general aviation facility.

Facilities and aircraft 
It has two asphalt paved runways: 18/36 is 3,496 by 50 feet (1,066 x 15 m) and 10/28 is 3,000 by 50 feet (914 x 15 m). For the 12-month period ending October 31, 2017, the airport had 54,100 aircraft operations, an average of 148 per day: 99.8% general aviation and 0.2% military.

History
The airport was built by the United States Army Air Forces during 1942/43 as an axillary airfield for Stuttgart Army Airfield, near Stuttgart, Arkansas.  It was known simply as Stuttgart Army Airfield Auxiliary #5.  The runways in use today were built during that period.   It was used to help train medium bomber and transport pilots, who used it for emergencies on it or practiced touch-and-go landings.   It was not manned, and at the end of World War II it was simply abandoned and the land turned over to local authorities, like many other small auxiliary airfields. 

The City of Almyra developed the current airport from the former military airfield. Some of the old wartime runways and taxiways still can be seen, which have not been used since the war ended.

References

External links 
 Aerial image as of 28 February 2000 from USGS The National Map
 
 

Airports in Arkansas
Buildings and structures in Arkansas County, Arkansas
Transportation in Arkansas County, Arkansas